Jack Andrew Smith (born 17 December 1998) is a speedway rider from England.

Career
He rode in the top tier of British Speedway riding for the Swindon Robins in the SGB Premiership 2018. He rode for Glasgow Tigers in the SGB Championship 2021.

In 2023, he signed for Belle Vue Colts for the 2023 NDL season, it was his sixth consecutive season with the Colts.

References 

1998 births
Living people
British speedway riders
Belle Vue Colts riders
Glasgow Tigers riders